The 1968 Big League World Series took place from August 7–10 in Winston-Salem, North Carolina, United States. Charleston, West Virginia defeated New Hyde Park, New York in the championship game.

This was the inaugural BLWS.

Teams

Results

References

Big League World Series
Big League World Series